This list of botanical gardens and arboretums in New Jersey is intended to include all significant botanical gardens and arboretums in the U.S. state of New Jersey

See also
List of botanical gardens and arboretums in the United States

References 

 
 
Tourist attractions in New Jersey
botanical gardens and arboretums in New Jersey